Langtoft may refer to:

Langtoft, East Riding of Yorkshire, England
Langtoft, Lincolnshire, England
Peter Langtoft (died 1305), English historian and chronicler of the 13th century